Nathaniel Parmeter House is a historic home located at Potsdam in St. Lawrence County, New York.  It was built about 1830 and is a -story, three-by-two-bay, gable-roofed rural Federal-style residence constructed of red Potsdam Sandstone in the slab and binder style.  A 1-story frame ell was removed in 1935.

It was listed on the National Register of Historic Places in 2003.

References

Houses on the National Register of Historic Places in New York (state)
Federal architecture in New York (state)
Houses completed in 1830
Houses in St. Lawrence County, New York
1830 establishments in New York (state)
National Register of Historic Places in St. Lawrence County, New York